This is a list of summer toboggan installations worldwide, including both alpine slide
and mountain coaster types.

Andorra

Australia

Austria

Belgium

Canada

China

France

Germany

Hungary 

Length means full length with elevator(s) and the section between the "end" and "start" point.

Iran

Italy

Jamaica

Japan

Kazakhstan

New Zealand

Russia

Serbia

Spain

Sweden

Switzerland

United Kingdom

United States

Vietnam

References

Summer toboggans
Summer toboggans